Apriona brunneomarginata is a species of beetle in the family Cerambycidae. It was described by Breuning in 1948. It is known from Borneo.

References

Batocerini
Beetles described in 1948